Major Edward Mary Joseph Molyneux   (13 March 1866 – 19 January 1913) was a British painter.

During his years in the Himalayan Valley of Kashmir, Molyneux painted many scenes of the capital city of Srinagar and other areas which inspired him. The paintings were published in a book titled Kashmir (1909), accompanied by descriptions of the Valley by Francis Younghusband.

His nephew was Edward Henry Molyneux, fashion designer.

References

1866 births
1913 deaths
19th-century British painters
British male painters
20th-century British painters
British art collectors
Companions of the Order of the Indian Empire
Companions of the Distinguished Service Order
19th-century British male artists
20th-century British male artists